Opilioacarus is a genus of opilioacarid mites native to the Mediterranean region. The following species are recognised:
Opilioacarus baeticus Moraza et al. 2022, Iberian Peninsula
Opilioacarus brignolii Araújo & di Palma, 2018, Southern Italy, Sardinia
Opilioacarus italicus (With, 1904) Sicily
Opilioacarus segmentatus With, 1902 Greece, Algeria, Uzbekistan? (possibly in need of splitting)
Opilioacarus aenigmus Dunlop et al. 2004 Baltic amber, Eocene
?Opilioacarus groehni Dunlop & Bernardi, 2014 Burmese amber, Myanmar, Late Cretaceous (Cenomanian) (tentatively placed in this genus)
The following species have been transferred elsewhere:
Opilioacarus bajacalifornicus Vázquez & Klompen, 2002
Opilioacarus nicaraguensis Vázquez & Klompen, 2002
Opilioacarus nohbecanus Vázquez & Klompen, 2002
Opilioacarus ojastii (Lehtinen, 1980)
Opilioacarus orghidani Juvara-Bals & Baltac, 1977
Opilioacarus platensis Silvestri, 1905
Opilioacarus siankaanensis Vázquez & Klompen, 2002
Opilioacarus texanus (Chamberlin & Mulaik, 1942)
Opilioacarus vanderhammeni Juvara-Bals & Baltac, 1977

References

 

Acari genera